Artyom Konstantinovich Fedchuk (born 20 December 1994) is a Russian football player.

Club career
He made his debut in the Russian Professional Football League for FC Spartak-2 Moscow on 5 October 2013 in a game against FC Kaluga. He made his Russian Football National League debut for Spartak-2 on 11 July 2015 in a game against FC Tom Tomsk.

He played in the 2017–18 Russian Cup final for FC Avangard Kursk on 9 May 2018 in the Volgograd Arena against 2-1 winners FC Tosno.

He signed with Russian Premier League club FC Tambov in December 2019. He made his Russian Premier League debut for Tambov on 7 March 2020 in a game against FC Dynamo Moscow. He substituted Mikhail Kostyukov in the 78th minute.

On 6 August 2020 he was loaned to FC Nizhny Novgorod for the 2020–21 season. On 1 February 2021, Nizhny Novgorod ended the loan early.

On 4 February 2021, he moved to FC Veles Moscow.

References

1994 births
Sportspeople from Lipetsk
Living people
Russian people of Ukrainian descent
Russian footballers
Russia youth international footballers
Association football forwards
FC Avangard Kursk players
FC Tambov players
FC Nizhny Novgorod (2015) players
FC Veles Moscow players
FC SKA Rostov-on-Don players
Russian Premier League players
FC Chayka Peschanokopskoye players
FC Spartak-2 Moscow players